VEF Spidola was the first mass-produced transistor radio with short wave band in the Soviet Union (tube short wave receivers were produced for many years before). It was manufactured by the VEF factory in Riga, Latvia, since 1962. A small series under the name "Spidola" (Спидола ПМП-60) was manufactured since 1960. It was named after the fictional witch Spīdola from the Latvian epic poem.

The word "spidola" was a genericised trademark for "transistor radio" for a long time in Russian (other synonyms included "transistor").

In many cases, the Spidola was used to listen to Western stations (such as the Voice of America, Radio Free Europe/Radio Liberty, BBC, Deutsche Welle). The criminal prosecution of at least one Soviet dissident involved confiscation of the Spidola as an "instrument of crime," but without specifying the "crime" committed with the confiscated Spidola.

Specifications 
First, "Spidola" was a ten-transistor, seven-band superheterodyne. Some versions were eight-band.
 Intermediate frequency: 465 kHz.
 Tuning range Longwave, Medium Wave and more than five short waves ranges (13, 16, 19, 25, 31, 41, 49 and 52–75 meters).
 Sensitivity: 1.5 - 2 mV/m (broadcast), 100 µV (short wave).
 Selectivity (±10 kHz): 32 dB or better
 Power supply: six D cells, or two 3R12 batteries, of 9 V total. 
 Output power: 150 mW.
 Average current consumption: 25 mA.
 Dimensions: 275×197×90 mm.
 Weight without batteries: 2.2 kg.
 Price (after 1961 denomination): abt. 73 rubles.

See also 
 VEF

References

Economy of Latvia
Science and technology in the Soviet Union
Soviet brands
Goods manufactured in the Soviet Union
Radio in the Soviet Union